Monoxenus werneri is a species of beetle in the family Cerambycidae. It was described by Pierre Téocchi and al. in 2010. It is known from Tanzania.

References

Endemic fauna of Tanzania
werneri
Beetles described in 2010